is a role-playing video game developed by Gust. It is the twenty-second main entry in the Atelier series, the second game of the Secret storyline and the first game of the series with a returning protagonist. It is the sequel to Atelier Ryza: Ever Darkness & the Secret Hideout.

The game was released on December 3, 2020, for PlayStation 4, PlayStation 5 and Nintendo Switch in Japan. A version with English subtitles was released on January 26, 2021 in North America, and on January 29, 2021 in Europe, along with a version for Microsoft Windows in all three regions. 

A sequel titled Atelier Ryza 3: Alchemist of the End & the Secret Key is scheduled to release for Microsoft Windows, Nintendo Switch, PlayStation 4, and PlayStation 5 in March 2023.

Gameplay
The game features the same gameplay style of the previous title. Players must craft items using alchemy to equip the party and accomplish missions. The combat system incorporating elements from both turn-based and real-time also returns, but with improvements.

Plot
Three years after her previous adventure, Reisalin "Ryza" Stout works as both an alchemist and a teacher in Kurken Island until she is invited by her friend Tao Mongarten who is studying with another friend, Bos Brunnen in the capital city of Ashra-am Baird to help with his research on some nearby ruins. In the occasion, she is tasked by Bos' father, Moritz Brunnen, to discover more about a mysterious stone in his possession. Taking the stone with her, she travels to the capital and reunites with Tao and Bos. Ryza and Tao begin their investigation, accompanied by Tao's pupil, Patricia Abelheim, but soon after, Ryza discovers that the stone is actually an egg, from which a mysterious creature hatches, whom she gives the name "Fi".

As Ryza and co. continue their research on the ruins and their connection with Fi, they reunite with their friends Klaudia Valentz and Lent Marslink, with treasure hunter Clifford Diswell and a member of the Oren race called Serri Galus also joining the party. They also meet their former teachers Empel Vollmer and Lila Decyrus, who make their own research in separate from the others. In the occasion, Empel reveals that Fi is a creature from the Underworld who needs to absorb large quantities of mana to survive, and must be sent back to their original habitat or will not survive for long. To prevent this, Ryza and her friends keep uncovering the mysteries of the ruins with Fi absorbing the energy from the large mana crystals inside them for nourishment.

Meanwhile, Empel and Lila learn that the mana crystals act as a seal that protects the region but fail to warn Ryza before Fi absorbs the energy from the last of the crystals, lifting the seal and unlocking a hidden temple. Inside the temple, Ryza's party discover a large gate to the Underworld from which a stronger breed of Philuscha emerges. The party confronts and repels the Philuscha after defeating their leader, the Legendary Monarch. Ryza then bids farewell to Fi, who passes through the gate before Empel seals it. With all matters solved, Ryza bids farewell to her friends and returns home, certain that she will eventually meet them again.

Reception

Upon release, Atelier Ryza 2 received "generally favorable" reviews on all platforms, according to review aggregator Metacritic.

By December 2020, the game has sold 220,000 copies in the first month throughout Asia. Atelier Ryza and Atelier Ryza 2 combined shipments exceed one million copies by March 2021. As of September 14, 2022, the Atelier Ryza series has sold over 1.3 million units.

Notes

References

External links
 
 

2020 video games
Gust Corporation games
Japanese role-playing video games
Koei Tecmo games
Nintendo Switch games
PlayStation 4 games
PlayStation 5 games
Video games developed in Japan
Video games featuring female protagonists
Windows games
Atelier (video game series)